Spider-Man 2 is a 2004 American superhero film which forms part of Sam Raimi's Spider-Man trilogy.

Spider-Man 2 may also refer to:
 Spider-Man 2: Enter Electro, a 2001 video game
 Spider-Man 2 (2004 video game), the video games based on the 2004 film
 Spider-Man 2 (soundtrack), the soundtrack of the 2004 film
 Spider-Man 2 (2023 video game), upcoming 2023 video game, sequel to Spider-Man (2018)

See also
 Spider-Man (disambiguation)
 Spider-Man 3 (disambiguation)
 The Amazing Spider-Man 2 (disambiguation)

Spider-Man